Djeno is a small village in the Kouilou Region of Congo-Brazzaville. It is located near the Total E&P Congo, after Pointe-Noire along the road called "Ligne Neuf". The population is about 1,500 inhabitants, who are called Vily. Djeno is around 30 kilometers from the city of Pointe-Noire.

Climate 

The climate is hot and humid, like other parts of Congo-Brazzaville.

Culture 

The population, called Vily, practice ancestor worship and follow traditional customs, called Binkoko. Some of the population have converted to Christianity.

Economy 
Djeno's economy is agricultural. The people produce cassava and vegetables and go fishing in rivers such as Loeme and Nanga.

Transport 
A bus is available from Pointe-Noire to Djeno for 500 CFA on the outward journey and 300 CFA to return.

Tourism  

Populated places in the Republic of the Congo
Kouilou Department